The Angry Brigade was a far-left British terrorist group responsible for a series of bomb attacks in England between 1970 and 1972. Using small bombs, they targeted banks, embassies, a BBC Outside Broadcast vehicle, and the homes of Conservative Members of Parliament (MPs). In total, police attributed 25 bombings to the Angry Brigade. The bombings mostly caused property damage; one person was slightly injured. Of the eight people who stood trial, known as the Stoke Newington Eight, four were acquitted. John Barker, along with Hilary Creek, Anna Mendelssohn and Jim Greenfield, were convicted on majority verdicts, and sentenced to ten years. In a 2014 interview, Barker described the trial as political, but acknowledged that "they framed a guilty man".

History

Origins 
In mid-1968 demonstrations took place in London, centred on the US embassy in Grosvenor Square, against US involvement in the Vietnam War. One of the organisers of these demonstrations, Tariq Ali, has said he recalls an approach by someone representing the Angry Brigade who wished to bomb the embassy; he told them it was a terrible idea and no bombing took place.

1970s 
The Angry Brigade decided to launch a bombing campaign with small bombs, in order to maximise media exposure to their demands while keeping collateral damage to a minimum. The campaign started in August 1970 and continued for a year until arrests took place the following summer.

Targets included banks, embassies, a BBC Outside Broadcast vehicle earmarked for use in the coverage of the 1970 Miss World event, and the homes of Conservative Members of Parliament (MPs). In total, police attributed 25 bombings to the Angry Brigade. The bombings mostly caused property damage; one person was slightly injured.

Resurfaced Angry Brigade of the 1980s
In the 1980s the Angry Brigade resurfaced as the Angry Brigade Resistance Movement, part of the Irish Republican Socialist Movement (IRSM).

Aftermath
Jake Prescott, whose origins were in the mining community of Dunfermline, was arrested and tried in 1971. Melford Stevenson sentenced him to 15 years imprisonment (later reduced to 10), mostly spent in Category A high security prisons. Later he said he realised then that he "was the one who was angry and the people [he] met were more like the Slightly Cross Brigade". The other members of the group from North-East London, the "Stoke Newington Eight", were prosecuted for carrying out bombings as the Angry Brigade in one of the longest criminal trials of English history (it lasted from 30 May to 6 December 1972). As a result of the trial, John Barker, Jim Greenfield, Hilary Creek and Anna Mendelssohn received prison sentences of 10 years. A number of other defendants were found not guilty, including Stuart Christie, who had previously been imprisoned in Spain for carrying explosives with the intent to assassinate the caudillo Francisco Franco, and Angela Mason who became a director of the LGBT rights group Stonewall and was awarded an OBE for services to homosexual rights.

In February 2002, Prescott apologised for his role in bombing Robert Carr's house and called on other members of the Angry Brigade to also come forward.

On 3 February 2002, The Guardian reported a history of the Angry Brigade and an update on what its former members were doing then.

On 9 August 2002, BBC Radio 4 aired Graham White’s historical drama, The Trial of the Angry Brigade. Produced by Peter Kavanagh, this was a reconstruction of the trial combined with other background information. The cast included Kenneth Cranham, Juliet Stevenson, Tom Hiddleston and Mark Strong.

In 2009, family care activist and novelist Erin Pizzey was successful in a libel case against Macmillan Publishers after Andrew Marr's History of Modern Britain had falsely linked her to the Angry Brigade. The publisher also recalled and destroyed the offending version of the book, and republished it with the error removed. The link to the Angry Brigade was made in 2001, in an interview with The Guardian, in which the article states that she was "thrown out" of the feminist movement after threatening to inform police about a planned bombing by the Angry Brigade of the clothes shop Biba. "I said that if you go on with this – they were discussing bombing Biba [the legendary department store in Kensington] – I'm going to call the police in, because I really don't believe in this."

The group and trial feature in Jake Arnott's 2006 novel Johnny Come Home. Hari Kunzru's 2007 novel My Revolutions is inspired by the Angry Brigade. The Angry Brigade is a 2014 play by James Graham.

See also
Terrorist attacks in London
Walsall Anarchists
Urban Guerrilla (Hawkwind)
First of May Group
Anarchism in the United Kingdom
Black Mask
King Mob
Movement 2 June

Notes

References

Further reading
 The Angry Brigade: A history of Britain's first urban guerrilla group, Gordon Carr, 1975 (reissued by Stuart Christie 2005) 
 The Angry Brigade 1967–1984: Documents and Chronology, Bratach Dubh Anarchist Pamphlets, 1978
 Anarchy in the UK: The Angry Brigade, Tom Vague, AK Press, 1997, 
 Bending the Bars, John Barker, Christie Books, 2002 (reissued 2006). .
 Alan Burns, The Angry Brigade: A Documentary Novel (Allison & Busby, 1973).
 Gordon Carr, John Barker, Stuart Christie, The Angry Brigade: A History of Britain's First Urban Guerilla Group, 1975 (reissued 2005). .
 Gordon Carr, The Angry Brigade: The Spectacular Rise and Fall of Britain's First Urban Guerilla Group (DVD), BBC, January 1973. Released on DVD in 2008 by PM Press.
 Gordon Carr, The Persons Unknown (DVD) 1980. Features as a DVD extra on the January 1973 BBC documentary The Angry Brigade: The Spectacular Rise and Fall of Britain's First Urban Guerilla Group.
 Edward Heath Made Me Angry, Stuart Christie, Christie Books, 2004. 978-1873976234.
 Granny Made me an Anarchist: General Franco, The Angry Brigade and Me, Stuart Christie, Scribner, 2004. 978-0743263566.
 Tom Vague, Anarchy in the UK: The Angry Brigade, AK Press, 1997, . (Issue 27 of punk rock fanzine Vague.  An earlier shorter version appeared as an article in issue 16 Psychic Terrorism Annual in 1985, reprinted in issue 25 The Great British Mistake in 1994.)
 Graham White, The Trial of the Angry Brigade, BBC Radio 4. Produced by Peter Kavanagh and broadcast 9 August 2002.

External links

A personal memory of Anna in 1968
Libertarian community and organising resource. Libertarian communism and anarchism in the UK
Angry Brigade: Documents and Chronology, 1967–1984
John Barker's review of Tom Vague's Anarchy in the UK: the Angry Brigade
Look back in anger (An article by The Observer on the 30th Anniversary of their trial)
Interview with Stuart Christie (3:AM Magazine)
Interview with John Barker (3:AM Magazine)
British minister's home bombed (BBC 'On This Day' article)
Timeline of actions (spunk.org)
Obituary of Anna Mendleson
1973 article on the Stoke Newington Eight trial
John Barker's personal page on Through Europe
Christie Books

Defunct anarchist militant groups
Anti-consumerist groups
Anarchist organisations in the United Kingdom
1970 establishments in the United Kingdom
1972 disestablishments in the United Kingdom
Organizations established in 1970
Organizations disestablished in 1972
Left-wing militant groups in the United Kingdom
Defunct anarchist organizations in Europe 
Terrorist incidents in the United Kingdom in 1970
Terrorist incidents in the United Kingdom in 1971
Terrorist incidents in the United Kingdom in 1972